Cythara glareosa is a species of sea snail, a marine gastropod mollusk in the family Mangeliidae.

This species is considered a nomen dubium.

Description
The length of the shell attains 5 mm, its diameter 2 mm.

Distribution
This marine species occurs off South Africa; in the Indian Ocean; off Hong Kong.

References

External links
  Tucker, J.K. 2004 Catalog of recent and fossil turrids (Mollusca: Gastropoda). Zootaxa 682: 1–1295.
 Smithsonian Institution: Mangelia glareosa
  R.I. Johnson, The Recent Mollusca of Augustus Addison Gould; United States National Museum, bulletin 239, Washington D.C. 1964

glareosa
Gastropods described in 1860